Elbrick is a surname. Notable people with the surname include:

Charles Burke Elbrick (1908–1983), American diplomat
Xanthe Elbrick (born 1978), English actress

See also
Elrick (name)